Kenneth Venner Ramsey (26 January 1909 – 21 June 1990) was the Suffragan Bishop of Hulme from 1953  until 1975.

He was educated at Portsmouth Grammar School and University College, Oxford. After a curacy at St Matthew, Stretford he was Vice-Principal of Egerton Hall, Manchester, and a Lecturer in Christian Ethics at  Manchester University. Later he held incumbencies at  Peel, Little Hulton and Didsbury before his elevation to the episcopate.

Notes

1909 births
People educated at The Portsmouth Grammar School
Alumni of University College, Oxford
Academics of the University of Manchester
20th-century Church of England bishops
Bishops of Hulme
1990 deaths